FK Yangiyer is Uzbekistani football club based in Yangiyer, Sirdaryo Province.

Achievements
Uzbek Cup: 
 Runners-Up (1): 1994

Managerial history

References

External links
 FK Yangyier matches and results

Football clubs in Uzbekistan